The 2017–18 Macedonian Football Cup was the 26th season of Macedonia's football knockout competition. Pelister are the defending champions, having won their second title in the previous year.

Competition calendar

First round
The matches were played on 16 and 30 August 2017.

|colspan="3" style="background-color:#97DEFF" align=center|16 August 2017

|-
|colspan="3" style="background-color:#97DEFF" align=center|30 August 2017

|-
|colspan="3" style="background-color:#97DEFF" align=center|31 August 2017

|-
|colspan="3" style="background-color:#97DEFF" align=center|N/A

|}

Second round
The first legs were played on 13 September and the second legs were played on 18 October 2017.

|}

Quarter-finals
The first legs were played on 8 November and the second legs were played on 29 November 2017.

|}

Semi-finals
The first legs were played on 14 March 2018 and the second legs were played on 11 April 2018.

Summary

|}

Matches

Shkëndija won 3–1 on aggregate.

3–3 on aggregate. Pelister won 3–2 in penalty shootout.

Final

See also
2017–18 Macedonian First Football League
2017–18 Macedonian Second Football League
2017–18 Macedonian Third Football League

References

External links
 Official Website

Macedonia
Cup
Macedonian Football Cup seasons